Spilomyia kahli is a species of syrphid fly in the family Syrphidae.

Distribution
Mexico, United States.

References

Eristalinae
Insects described in 1895
Diptera of North America
Hoverflies of North America